Providensky District (Chukchi: , Urèlḳujym rajon; Yupik: Уӷрилӄуйым район) is an administrative and municipal district (raion), one of the six in Chukotka Autonomous Okrug, Russia. It is located in the northeast of the autonomous okrug, in the southern half of the Chukchi Peninsula with a northwest extension reaching almost to the Kolyuchinskaya Bay on the Arctic. It borders with Chukotsky District in the north, the Bering Sea in the east and south, and with Iultinsky District in the west. Its administrative center is the urban locality (an urban-type settlement) of Provideniya. Population:  The population of Provideniya accounts for 50.2% of the district's total population.

Geography

The district lies in a mountainous region, with most of its inhabited localities found on the coast. Wetlands occupy the territory between mountain ranges and close to the shore near inlets and brackish lagoons. About a quarter of this consists of beaches and gravel spits with the remainder consisting of rugged, rocky coastline containing numerous fjords.

History

Prehistory
The history of human existence in what would become Providensky District can be traced back to the Paleolithic age, when hunter-gatherers lived in the area. Over the next few millennia, the hunters-gatherers split into two groups, with one staying in the tundra and the other moving closer to the sea for food.

Gradually, those who settled by the shore began to develop their own individual culture, including the construction of their homes and other buildings using whale bones as support, structures which would later develop into the yarangas. Excavations at many sites along the coast of the district, including present-day localities such as Enmelen, Nunligran, Yanrakynnot, and Sireniki, indicate an abundance of food as well as indicating a considerable degree of continuity in terms of indigenous settlement. As a result, the southeastern part of the coast is home to a large number of Beringian monuments and archaeological sites, with the area around Arakamchechen Island, Yttygran Island, and the Senyavin Straits having been given protected area status as part of the Beringia Park. Providensky District also includes Yttygran Island, which features an area known as "Whale Bone Alley", where the jaw bones and ribs of Bowhead whales are arranged on the beach. There is also a large, permanent polynya near Sireniki.

17th–19th centuries
In the 17th century, Semyon Dezhnyov and his Cossacks founded the ostrog (fortress) of Anadyrsk and began to explore Chukotka. One expedition, led by Dezhnyov's successor Kurbat Ivanov, resulted in the discovery of the Provideniya Bay, although the bay did not receive this name until it was "re-discovered" by Captain Thomas E. L. Moore in 1848. Vitus Bering discovered the Preobrazheniye Bay on his first Kamchatka expedition in 1728.

In the 18th century, further inland exploration was performed by Joseph Billings under orders from Catherine the Great to explore her new land of Chukotka and to negotiate trade between Russians and Chukchi, something the Chukchi were pleased to do, since Anadyrsk, which had previously been the center for trade between the Russians and the local indigenous peoples, had closed and the Chukchi needed Russian goods.

Further exploration took place during the 19th century, when Fyodor Litke, the Arctic explorer, discovered and mapped the Senyavin Strait, the body of water that separates Arakamchechen Island, on which the rural locality of Yanrakynnot is found, from the mainland.

20th century
Providenskaya Volost was founded in 1923 as a part of Chukotsky Uyezd. The administrative center Provideniya—the largest inhabited locality east of Anadyr—was established in the 1930s as the port to serve the eastern end of the Northern Sea Route. The port stands on the Komsomolskaya Bay (named after the Soviet Komsomol youth organization), a branch of the much larger Provideniya Bay, providing a suitable deep water harbor for Russian ships, close to the southern limits of the winter ice fields.

In its present form, the district was founded on April 25, 1957 by splitting its territory from the territory of Chukotsky District.

Historical sites in Providensky District

Although there is a large number of ancient settlements and sites spread across the whole of Chukotka, a particularly high number of such sites is located in Providensky District. These sites range from the stone-age sites, to sites originally established in the Middle Ages, which continued to be populated into the 20th century. A large number of these, like many indigenous settlements still extant in the beginning of the 20th century, were closed as a result of Soviet collectivization policies. Following the dissolution of the Soviet Union, a number of these settlements have been repopulated by indigenous people looking to regain use of traditional hunting areas.

The table below outlines some of the more significant historical site in Providensky District

Demographics
As is typical in Chukotka, the majority of the population lives in the district's main urban center, in this case Provideniya, and the immediate surrounding area. As in Chukotsky District, the isolation of this area, even by Chukotkan standards, means that there is a significantly higher percentage of indigenous inhabitants than in many of the other districts in the autonomous okrug, with the Chukchi the dominant indigenous group in the District. About 55% of the population are reported as being of specifically Chukchi origin.

Economy
Although the district has an urban center and port in Provideniya, the economy, thanks to the high indigenous population, is still centered around traditional agriculture, marine hunting (for gray and beluga whales) and fishing (for sockeye salmon, chum, Arctic char, and Arctic cod) as well as associated crafts. Reindeer herding is also a major source of income, even though the total number of reindeer in the district, 1,202, is substantially smaller than in some of the larger districts in the autonomous okrug. In order to encourage the continuation of this type of economy, there is a training college for reindeer herders in Provideniya. Future plans for the district include continuing to grow reindeer farming and related enterprises as well as developing seal fisheries.

Provideniya is described as "the largest Russian port in the Western Hemisphere". The importance of Provideniya as a port decreased in the 1990s following a decrease of traffic on the Northern Sea Route, although it is still used as the arrival point for American tourists arriving from Nome.

Transportation

Along with the port, the district is also served by the Provideniya Bay Airport, where Chukotavia provide flights to Anadyr. The airport has played a significant role in developing relations with the United States since the dissolution of the Soviet Union in the late 1980s, with Alaska Air flights to Provideniya regularly occurring throughout the 1990s.

Administrative and municipal status
Within the framework of administrative divisions, Providensky District is one of the six in the autonomous okrug. The urban-type settlement of Provideniya serves as its administrative center. The district does not have any lower-level administrative divisions and has administrative jurisdiction over one urban-type settlement and five rural localities.

As a municipal division, the district is incorporated as Providensky Municipal District and is divided into one urban settlement and three rural settlements.

Inhabited localities

Divisional source:

*Administrative centers are shown in bold

References

Notes

Sources

Petit Futé: Chukotka, Strogoff, M, Brochet, P–C and Auzias, D. "Avant-Garde" Publishing House, 2006.
Provideniya Museum Catalogue, various authors, translated by Bland, R.L., Shared Beringia Heritage Program, National Park Service, U.S. Department of the Interior. April 2002.

External links
 Official site

 
Districts of Chukotka Autonomous Okrug